KDYA (1190 kHz), "Gospel 1190 The Light", is a commercial AM radio station owned by Salem Media Group and licensed to Vallejo, California, serving the San Francisco Bay Area. It broadcasts an urban gospel radio format, and is Northern California's only full-time Urban Gospel station reaching San Francisco, Sacramento, Santa Rosa and Stockton.

The radio studios and offices are on Blume Drive in Richmond, California. KDYA is a daytimer, transmitting 3,000 watts, using a directional antenna. 1190 AM is a clear channel frequency reserved for Class A KEX Portland, Oregon, and XEWK Guadalajara, so KDYA must sign off at sunset to avoid interference.  The transmitter is on Noble Road in Vallejo, on San Pablo Bay.

History
Originally, the station signed on the air on August 1, 1947, as KGYW.

Later, as KNBA -- "Kovers North Bay Area" — the station presented a "middle of the road" (MOR) format. With studios and transmitter on Sonoma Boulvard in Vallejo, the station was long owned by Louis J. Ripa until his death February 20, 1992. The KNBA call sign was in use from August 22, 1958 until December 27, 1993, when the call letters changed to KXBT.

Expanded Band assignment
In 1979, a World Administrative Radio Conference (WARC-79) adopted "Radio Regulation No. 480", which stated that "In Region 2, the use of the band 1605-1705 kHz by stations of the broadcasting service shall be subject to a plan to be established by a regional administrative radio conference..." As a consequence, on June 8, 1988 an ITU-sponsored conference held at Rio de Janeiro, Brazil adopted provisions, effective July 1, 1990, to extend the upper end of the Region 2 AM broadcast band, by adding ten frequencies which spanned from 1610 kHz to 1700 kHz.

While the Federal Communications Commission (FCC) was still making U.S. preparations to populate the additional frequencies, known as the "Expanded Band", a provision was added to the Communications Act of 1934 in late 1991 which mandated that priority for assignments would be given to existing daytime-only stations that were located in a community with a population over 100,000, and which also did not have any full-time stations. Taking advantage of this provision, on March 19, 1996 KXBT began to also broadcast on 1640 kHz, as the second U.S. station, following WJDM in Elizabeth, New Jersey, authorized to operate on an expanded band frequency.

On March 22, 1996, the FCC issued an updated list of expanded band allotments, which now assigned KBXT to 1630 kHz, so  transmissions were switched to that frequency. On March 17, 1997 the FCC released a revised roster of eighty-eight expanded band assignments, with KXBT designated to move back to 1640 kHz. The expanded band operation, also in Vallejo, was now treated as being a separate station with its own unique call sign, and a Construction Permit for it was assigned the call letters KDIA on April 17, 1998.

The FCC's initial policy was that both the original station and its expanded band counterpart could operate simultaneously for up to five years, after which owners would have to turn in one of the two licenses, depending on whether they preferred the new assignment or elected to remain on the original frequency. However, this deadline has been extended multiple times, and both stations have remained authorized, with sister station KDIA at 1640 AM now a Christian talk and teaching station. One restriction is that the FCC has generally required paired original and expanded band stations to remain under common ownership.

Later history
1190 AM switched to its current call sign, KDYA on June 1, 1998. The station carried Oakland Athletics Spanish language baseball broadcasts in the daytime, while KDIA 1640 would broadcast night games from 2009 to the middle of the 2010 season.

Effective June 1, 2021, Baybridge Communications sold KDYA and sister station KDIA to Salem Media Group for $600,000.

References

External links 
FCC History Cards for KDYA

DYA
Radio stations established in 1947
Gospel radio stations in the United States
1947 establishments in California
Mass media in Vallejo, California
DYA
DYA
Salem Media Group properties